Different Directions is a DVD/CD combo by  Champion released in March, 2007.  It documents their history and includes a DVD of their last show, interviews, and early band discography.

Track listing 
"Promises Kept"
"4th Of July"
"Decisions Made"
"Different Directions"
"Monument"
"The Decline"
"The Truth"
"Time Slips Away"
"Thank You Note"
"Perspective"
"Assume the Worst"
"The Insider"
"One Sixteen"
"Next Year"

References

Champion (band) live albums
2007 live albums
2007 video albums
Live video albums
Bridge 9 Records live albums
Bridge 9 Records video albums